Serpent's Tail is London-based independent publishing firm founded in 1986 by Pete Ayrton. It specialises in publishing work in translation, particularly European crime fiction. In January 2007, it was bought by a British publisher Profile Books.

Publications
The firm publishes both fiction and non-fiction books. Boyd Tonkin, writing for The Independent, has described the publisher's list: "from hard-boiled noir to gems in translation and left-field cultural reportage – often defines the meaning of 'cool'."

Noted writers
 Derek Raymond 
 Elfriede Jelinek
 Elizabeth Young 
 Herta Müller
 Jonathan Trigell
 Kathy Acker
 Kenzaburō Ōe
 Lionel Shriver
 Nicholas Royle
 Stella Duffy

Noted debut novels
 Nineteen Seventy-Four by David Peace
 The South by Colm Tóibín 
 Whatever by Michel Houellebecq

High Risk Books
High Risk Books was an imprint of Serpent's Tail that existed from 1993-1997. It was founded by Ira Silverberg and Amy Scholder and aimed to publish innovative, provocative, and progressive literature (such as Kathy Acker and William S. Burroughs), poetry (including Jayne Cortez), and non-fiction (including the collected journalism of Cookie Mueller).

References

External links
{[Official|https://www.serpentstail.com/}
The Fales Library Guide to the Serpent's Tail/High Risk Archives

1986 establishments in the United Kingdom
Book publishing companies of the United Kingdom
Publishing companies established in 1986